José Jefsson Cordeiro de Sá (born April 13, 1989 in Moreilândia), known as Moreilândia, is a Brazilian footballer who plays for Salgueiro as midfielder.

Career statistics

References

External links

1989 births
Living people
Brazilian footballers
Association football midfielders
Campeonato Brasileiro Série C players
Campeonato Brasileiro Série D players
Grêmio Catanduvense de Futebol players
Mogi Mirim Esporte Clube players
C.D. Trofense players
Salgueiro Atlético Clube players